, also known as Dun-Huang, is a 1988 Japanese film directed by Junya Satō. The movie was adapted from the 1959 novel Tun-Huang by Yasushi Inoue. The backdrop of the plotline is the Mogao Caves, a Buddhist manuscript trove in Dunhuang, Western China, located along the Silk Road during the Song dynasty in the 11th century.

The film was released in Japan and China on June 25, 1988. It was chosen as Best Film at the Japan Academy Prize ceremony. It is one of the highest-grossing Japanese films of all time.

Cast
 Toshiyuki Nishida as Zhu Wangli, a commander of the Xi Xia empire
 Kōichi Satō as Zhao Xingde, a student of Zhu Wangli
 Anna Nakagawa as Tsurpia, a princess of a Uyghur kingdom
 Tsunehiko Watase as Li Yuanhao, the Xi Xia emperor
 Takahiro Tamura as Tsao Yanhui

Reception
The Silk Road was the number one Japanese film on the domestic market in 1988, earning ¥4.5 billion in distribution income that year. It was the third highest-grossing Japanese film up until then, after Antarctica and The Adventures of Milo and Otis, and remains one of the highest-grossing Japanese films. In the United States, it grossed $123,959.

See also
 List of historical drama films of Asia

References

Bibliography

External links
 
 

1988 films
1988 drama films
1980s Japanese-language films
Films directed by Junya Satō
Films set in 11th-century Song dynasty
Films set in the Western Xia
Japanese drama films
Picture of the Year Japan Academy Prize winners
Toho films
1980s Japanese films